Michael Sanders Brunson (July 30, 1947 – September 18, 2002) was an American football running back. He was born in Little Rock, Arkansas, and attended high school in Colorado. He began playing college football for Colorado Mesa and then transferred to Arizona State where he played during the 1968 and 1969 seasons. He was selected by the Atlanta Falcons in the 11th round of the 1970 NFL Draft. He appeared in eight games for the Falcons during the 1970 season. His brother Larry Brunson also played in the NFL.

References

1947 births
2002 deaths
American football running backs
Colorado Mesa Mavericks football players
Arizona State Sun Devils football players
Atlanta Falcons players
Sportspeople from Little Rock, Arkansas
Players of American football from Arkansas